King's Business School (KBS) is the business school of King's College London located in London, the United Kingdom and is a constituent academic faculty of the university. King's College London was ranked 5th in the United Kingdom in The Complete University Guide (2023) and 12th in The Guardian's Business, Management & Marketing league table (2022).

KBS offers undergraduate and postgraduate courses and Executive Education programmes. The undergraduate courses are classified as a Bachelor of Science (BSc) and postgraduate courses such as a Master of Science (MSc.), Postgraduate Diploma (PG Dip), Postgraduate Certificate (PG Cert), Master of Philosophy (MPhil) and PhD (Doctor of Philosophy) are offered.

KBS also offers overseas exchange courses with other universities, including the University of Toronto, Wharton School of the University of Pennsylvania, the University of Hong Kong, the University of Sydney

History 
The School of Management & Business was founded in King's College London in the 1980s. In 1994, the School achieved departmental status and was formally established as the School of Management & Business in 2015.

Since the acquisition of Bush House in a bid to expand the university's Strand Campus, KBS moved to the new building in August 2017 formally as the ninth faculty of the university.

Degree programs 
KBS offers both undergraduate and postgraduate degrees. Undergraduate management courses base their curriculum on "modern business theory and organisational management theory and practice". Other fields that overlap with the core content being taught include finance, accounting, economics, social science, psychology, and law. Undergraduate courses such as Business Management feature a high percentage of international students (81%) and a large female cohort, comprising 58% of the student body.

Executive Education 
KBS Executive Education offers practical business courses, online and on-campus in central London, for mid-career and senior experienced professionals. These courses give the opportunity to review current ways of working, to add essential management and leadership skills, and to gain confidence and new perspectives. KBS currently cover topics including strategic finance, governance and compliance, people management, and marketing.

Student life 

All students of KCL are automatically members of the King's College London Student Union (KCLSU).

Based in the Strand Campus of King's College London the Campus includes a wing of Somerset House, which itself contains cafes, stores, and hosts seasonal activities such as ice skating.

King's Business Club 

In 2008, Zain Jaffer, later the founder of Vungle, established the university's first student-led business society, King's Business Club (formerly known as KCL Business Club). It claims to be the longest continuously running student organisation of its kind in the country. With a student membership of more than 3000 at King's College London alone, it is the largest business and finance society in London. The student initiative's core principles are to inspire, educate, and connect fellow students towards prospective career paths. King's Business Club achieves these goals by organising keynotes with prominent figures such as Nobel Laureate Muhammad Yunus, company visits to offices of the Bulge Bracket and the Big Three, and international conferences and competitions.

References

External links 
 King's Business School
 Executive education at King's Business School
 King's Business School news and comment



Faculties of King's College London
Business schools in England
Business education in the United Kingdom